Hayley Sings Japanese Song 2 is, as the title suggests, the second Japanese-themed album by Christchurch, New Zealand soprano Hayley Westenra. Like its predecessor, the album contains Westenra's interpretations of traditional and popular contemporary Japanese songs. Some of the songs have been translated into English while others were sung in Japanese.

The album entered the Japanese charts at number 30 but rose to number 16 in its second week. The album was certified Gold in Taiwan.

The song "Nemu No Ki No Komoriuta" is based on a poem Empress Michiko wrote as a teenager.

Before the album's releasing, A special DVD features Westenra performing in a landscape of New Zealand with "Nemu No Ki No Komoriuta" and "Tsubomi" was released on 4 March 2009.

Track listing
Tsubomi 蕾 (Bud)
Mikazuki 三日月 (Crescent Moon)
Mirai E 未来へ (The Future)
Mama E ママへ (To Mother)
Love Love Love
秋桜 (Cosmos)
Warabigami ～Yamatoguchi～ 童神～ヤマトグチ～ (Child of God)
Mama Ni Sasageru Uta ママに捧げる詩(うた)(Mother of Mine)
Itsumo Nando Demo いつも何度でも (Many Times Always)
フラワー (Flower)
Nemu No Ki No Komoriuta ねむの木の子守歌 (Lullaby of Nemunoki)

Charts and certifications

Charts

Certifications

Release history

References

External links
 Official Site
 Amazon
 Amazon

2009 albums
Hayley Westenra albums